The C. Bascom Slemp Federal Building, also known as the Big Stone Gap Post Office and U.S. Post Office and Courthouse, is a historic courthouse and post office building located in Big Stone Gap, Wise County, Virginia. It was designed by the Office of the Supervising Architect under James Knox Taylor and built between 1911 and 1913.  It is a three-story, seven bay, stone building with a low hipped roof in the Second Renaissance Revival style. The front facade features a three bay Tuscan order portico consisting of four pairs of coupled, unfluted columns.  The building is named for Congressman C. Bascom Slemp.

It was listed on the National Register of Historic Places in 1975.

References

External links
"The federal courthouse in Big Stone Gap, Va., could close," Tricities.com, James Shea, March 28, 2012, Dec 20, 2012.
 

Federal buildings in the United States
Big Stone Gap
Courthouses on the National Register of Historic Places in Virginia
National Register of Historic Places in Wise County, Virginia
Government buildings completed in 1913
Buildings and structures in Wise County, Virginia
Renaissance Revival architecture in Virginia
1913 establishments in Virginia